Zack Pope (born March 20, 1986 in Austin, Texas) is an American soccer player.

Career

Youth and Amateur
Pope attended Stony Point High School, and played college soccer at Duke University on a partial soccer scholarship, graduating with a psychology degree and a minor in sociology.

He was drafted in the third round (40th overall) in the 2008 MLS Supplemental Draft by Chicago Fire, but was not offered a professional contract with the team. He would later rejoin Chicago Fire reserves and F.C. Dallas reserves in the 2008 season; after an abbreviated stint with the Rochester Rhinos, he joined the Aztex junior team, Austin Aztex U23 in 2008.

Professional
Pope joined the USL First Division expansion franchise Austin Aztex in March 2009. He made his professional debut on April 18, 2009, in Austin's USL1 season opener against Minnesota Thunder.

He was released by the Aztex at the end of the 2009 season.

He is currently the assistant soccer coach at Southwestern University in Georgetown, TX.

References

External links
 Austin Aztex bio
 Duke profile

1986 births
Living people
American soccer players
Austin Aztex players
Austin Aztex FC players
Austin Aztex U23 players
Austin Lightning players
Duke Blue Devils men's soccer players
Rochester New York FC players
USL First Division players
USL League Two players
Chicago Fire FC draft picks
Soccer players from Texas
Association football defenders